Electric two-wheeler sharing is a form of personal public transport that draws on collaborative consumption models of the sharing economy to provide a shared fleet of electric-assist pedal vehicles. It is a product service system more closely aligned to a bicycle sharing system than to carsharing.

In a presentation by Bradley Schroeder at the Asian region meeting of the Institute for Transportation Development Policy in Jakarta, Indonesia, in June 2014, Bradley Schroeder introduced the term e2W to describe such systems. In his book Bicycle Sharing 101: Getting the Wheels Turning', Schroeder concluded that "An area of potential huge growth is whether e-bike sharing can replace private scooter trips in Asian cities, where scooter use can be up to 75 percent." In Ho Chi Minh City, Vietnam, 78% of trips are made by scooters or motorcycles, with annual growth rates of 8.4% to the total fleet, according to the Asian Development Bank.

Motivations for the implementation of e2W systems are that they would provide an alternative to privately owned motorized two-wheeled vehicles, allowing the political will to regulate motor bikes in terms of parking, acceleration, top speeds, tail-pipe emissions and sound pollution.

References

Further reading 
 
 
 

Bicycle sharing